The monument to Maria Christina of Bourbon (Spanish: María Cristina de Borbón) is an instance of public art in Madrid, Spain. Designed by Mariano Benlliure and consisting of a bronze statue of the aforementioned queen consort and regent of Spain and a stone pedestal with additional sculptural elements, the monument lies in front of the Casón del Buen Retiro.

History and description

Lobbied by General Manuel Pavía y Lacy, the project for the monument was awarded to the architect  and to the sculptor Mariano Benlliure. 

The pedestal lies above the basement; similar to the monument dedicated to another female individual such as Bárbara de Braganza'''s, a borderless cylindrical pedestal was employed. The lower part of the pedestal features a circular frieze with lion heads and garlands. The (frontal) part of the pedestal facing west displays a cartouche reading ) ("To Maria Christina of Bourbon. A recognised Spain"), while the part of the pedestal behind the queen's back features another cartouche reading "1893". The flanks of the pedestal feature two reliefs illustrating the 1839 Embrace of Vergara and Maria Christina signing the 1832 decree of amnesty (a document in favour of the political exiles who had fled from the absolutist crackdown of her husband King Ferdinand VII, in her role as governing queen during the illness of Ferdinand VII, preceding the latter's final demise in 1833).

The monument is topped by the bronze statue representing a full body figure of Maria Christina, holding the Royal Statute with her right hand while grabbing her mantle with the left hand.

Below the Queen, seated on the pedestal, there is a marble classicist statue representing a female allegory of History'', depicted with a naked nipple while holding a book that reads  ("History").

It was unveiled on 25 June 1893.

References
Citations

Bibliography
 
 
 

Bronze sculptures in Spain
Stone sculptures in Spain
Outdoor sculptures in Madrid
Sculptures by Mariano Benlliure
Sculptures of women in Spain
Monuments and memorials in Madrid
Buildings and structures in Jerónimos neighborhood, Madrid